Spring Hill is an unincorporated community in Augusta County, Virginia, United States.

In 1882, Spring Hill was a thriving village with several stores and two churches.  It, like other communities in Augusta County, flourished into the early 1900s. Today, all that is left is a Presbyterian church, some houses, and a few abandoned storefronts. It is part of the Staunton–Waynesboro Micropolitan Statistical Area.

References

Unincorporated communities in Augusta County, Virginia
Unincorporated communities in Virginia